Stanley James Obst (1 July 1926 – 22 December 2005) was an Australian rules footballer who played with St Kilda in the Victorian Football League (VFL).

Obst played his two games for St Kilda while serving in the Royal Australian Air Force during World War II.

Notes

External links 

1926 births
2005 deaths
Royal Australian Air Force personnel of World War II
St Kilda Football Club players
Military personnel from New South Wales
Australian rules footballers from Albury